Any Day Now may refer to:

Film and television 
 Any Day Now (1976 film) (Dutch: Vandaag of morgen), a science fiction film
 Any Day Now (2012 film), a film starring Alan Cumming
 Any Day Now (2020 film) (Finnish: Ensilumi), a drama film
 Any Day Now (TV series), a 1998-2002 American drama series

Music 
 "Any Day Now" (Burt Bacharach song), a 1962 song written by Burt Bacharach and Bob Hilliard, recorded by several artists
 "Any Day Now" (The Watchmen song)
 Any Day Now (The Archers album)
 Any Day Now (Goran Kralj album)
 Any Day Now (Joan Baez album)
 Any Day Now (The Legendary Pink Dots album)
 Any Day Now (Scott Walker album)
 Any Day Now (EP), an EP by Riddlin' Kids
 Any Day Now, an album by Chuck Jackson, including a version of the 1962 song
 The Any Day Now EP, by Elbow
 "Any Day Now", a song from the EP and from the album Asleep in the Back
 "Any Day Now", a 2021 song by Bo Burnham from the special Bo Burnham: Inside

See also
 "I Shall Be Released", a 1967 song by Bob Dylan whose chorus includes the words "Any day now"